The Wealth Defense Industry (also known as Corporate Wealth Defence) is described as "an army of lawyers, consultants, accountants, and more who get paid millions to help their clients hide trillions" - and is generally thought of as a vanguard of economic and legal actors involved in sustaining and hiding activities which hoard wealth from a wider (poorer) community, be it a nation, area or government. This can be done legally. Chuck Collins, heir to the Oscar Mayer fortune has somewhat confirmed the existence of The Wealth Defense industry and advocates against them on moral and emotional grounds. The language describing the phenomena originates within the political and behavioral sciences.

A ProPublica report on wealth inequality in regards to the richest people of the world is often cited as having shown the mechanisms of the modern wealth defense industry. Philanthropist Chuck Collins is a key advocate regarding being a client of The Wealth Defense industry, having written a book on the topic, titled "The Wealth Hoarders: How Billionaires Pay Millions to Hide Trillions".

History 

In an interview with Brenda Melina of the International Consortium of Investigative Journalists, The Panama Papers and the Paradise Papers are cited as well known examples of the Wealth Defense Industry. In 2017, Stanislav Markus and Volha Charnysh of Columbia and Cambridge respectively, performed a study of 177 post-soviet Oligarchs in Ukraine, and described Wealth Defense as aiding "oligarchs [to] benefit from direct power when the rule of law is weak."

Stages and Geopolitical context 

Lena Ajdacic of Amsterdam University has described Wealth Defense as having three distinct strategies and also uncover marked differences across countries. In 2017, Jeffery Winters of Harvard University's American Society for Political and Legal Philosophy, identified Liberal Democracy as being complicit in the Wealth Defense Industry.

Mechanisms 

Shell companies and tax havens are cited as being mechanisms the Wealth Defense Industry. It is claimed by Collins that Wealth Defense is not emotionally healthy for either party involved, in a Rolling Stone article he is quoted as saying; "These are people who are at the end of their professional careers, who are now looking back over what they’ve done and are saying, “Jeez, what have I done here? All I’ve done is help the richest people in society get a larger share of the pie.”  According to Dedrick Asante-Muhammad of the National Community Reinvestment Coalition, the discriminatory policies and practices of the wealth defense industry have contributed to causing people of color to fall behind economically.

See also 
 Surveillance Capitalism
 Panama Papers
 Paradise Papers
 Economic inequality
 Culture Industry

References 

Corporate tax avoidance
Tax terms